Gene therapy is being studied as a treatment for osteoarthritis (OA). Unlike pharmacological treatments which are administered systemically, gene therapy aims to establish sustained, synthesis of gene products and tissue rehabilitation within the joint.

Osteoarthritis has a high degree of heritable factors, and there may be genetic risk factors for the disease. Gene transfer strategies for the potential medical management of osteoarthritis are under preliminary research to define pathological mechanisms and possible treatments for this chronic disease. Both viral and non-viral vectors have been developed as a means to carry therapeutic genes and inject them into human cells.

Theory 
Passing from parents to children, genes are the building blocks of inheritance. They contain instructions for making proteins. If genes do not produce the right proteins in a correct way, a child can have a genetic disorder. Gene therapy is a molecular method aiming to replace defective or absent genes, or to counteract the ones undergoing overexpression. For this purpose, three techniques may be utilized: gene isolation, manipulations, and transferring to target cells. The most common form of gene therapy involves inserting a normal gene to replace an abnormal gene. Other approaches including repairing an abnormal gene and altering the degree to which a gene is turned on or off. Two basic methodologies are utilized to transfer vectors into target tissues; Ex vivo gene transfer and In-vivo gene transfer. One type of gene therapy in which the gene transfer takes place outside the patient's body is called ex vivo gene therapy. This method of gene therapy is more complicated but safer since it is possible to culture, test, and control the modified cells.

Significance and causes of osteoarthritis 
Osteoarthritis (OA) is a degenerative joint disease which is the western world's leading cause of pain and disability. It is characterized by the progressive loss of normal structure and function of articular cartilage, the smooth tissue covering the end of the moving bones. This chronic disease not only affects the articular cartilage but the subchondral bone, the synovium and periarticular tissues are other candidates. People with OA can experience severe pain and limited motion. OA is mostly the result of natural aging of the joint due to biochemical changes in the cartilage extracellular matrix.

Osteoarthritis is caused by mechanical factors such as joint trauma and mechanical overloading of joints or joint-instability. Since the degeneration of cartilage is an irreversible phenomenon, it is incurable, costly and responds poorly to treatment. Due to the prevalence of this disease, the repair and regeneration of articular cartilage has become a dominant area of research. The growing number of the people suffering from osteoarthritis and the effectiveness of the current treatments attract a great deal of attention to genetic-based therapeutic methods to treat the progression of this chronic disease.

Vectors for osteoarthritis gene delivery 
Various vectors have been developed to carry the therapeutic genes to cells. There are two broad categories of gene delivery vectors: Viral vectors, involving viruses and non-viral agents, such as polymers and liposomes.

Viral vectors 
Viral vectors proved to be more successful in transfecting cells as their life cycles require them to transfer their own genes to the host cells with high efficiency. A virus infects the human by inserting its gene directly into their cells. This can be deadly, but the brilliant idea is to take advantage of this natural ability. The idea is to remove all the dangerous genes in the virus and inject the healthy human genes. So, viruses are inserting positive elements to the host cells while attacking them and they will be helpful rather than harmful.

While viral vectors are 40% more efficient in transferring genes, they are not fully appreciated for in vivo gene delivery because of their further adverse effects. Primarily, viral vectors induce an inflammatory response, which can cause minor side effects such as mild edema or serious ones like multisystem organ failure. It is also difficult to administer gene therapy repeatedly due to the immune system's enhanced response to viruses. Furthermore, viruses may spread out to other organs after intraarticular injection and this will be an important disadvantage. However, majority of problems associated with gene delivery using viral vectors solved by ex vivo gene delivery method. In Osteoarthritis gene therapy, ex vivo method makes it possible to transfect not only the cells of the synovial lining of joints but also articular chondrocytes and chondroprogenitor cells in cartilage.

Non-viral vectors 
Non-viral methods involve complexing therapeutic DNA to various macromolecules including cationic lipids and liposomes, polymers, polyamines and polyethylenimine, and nanoparticles. FuGene 6  and modified cationic liposomes  are two non-viral gene delivery methods that have so far been utilized for gene delivery to cartilage. FuGene 6 is a non-liposomal lipid formulation, which has proved to be successful in transfecting a variety of cell lines. Liposomes have shown to be an appropriate candidate for gene delivery, where cationic liposomes are made to facilitate the interaction with the cell membranes and nucleic acids.
Unlike viral vectors, non-viral ones avoid the risk of acquiring replication competence. They have the capacity to deliver a large amount of therapeutic genes repeatedly, and it is convenient to produce them on a large scale. The most important of all, they do not elicit immune responses in the host organism. In spite of having advantages, non-viral vectors have not yet replaced viral vectors due to relatively low efficiency and short-term transgene expression.

Novel non-viral vectors for osteoarthritis gene delivery including polymeric vectors are still under investigations.

Target cells in osteoarthritis gene therapy 
Target cells in the OA therapy are autologous chondrocytes, Chondroprogenitor cells, Cells within the synovial cavity, and cells of adjacent tissues such as muscle, tendons, ligaments, and meniscus.

Development of cartilage function and structure may be achieved by: 
Inhibiting inflammatory and catabolic pathways
Stimulating anabolic pathways to rebuild the matrix 
Impeding cell senescence
Avoiding the pathological formation of osteophytes 
Prevention of apoptosis, and/or influencing several of these processes 

Approaches influencing several of these processes simultaneously have also shown to be successful, like transferring the combination of inhibitors of catabolism pathways and activators of anabolic events (IGF-I/IL-1RA), as well as that of activators of anabolic and proliferative processes (FGF- 2/SOX9 or FGF-2/IGF-I).

Gene defects leading to osteoarthritis 
Osteoarthritis has a great degree of heritability. Forms of osteoarthritis caused by single gene mutation have better chance of treatment by gene therapy.

Epidemiological studies have shown that a genetic component may be an important risk factor in OA. Insulin-like growth factor I genes (IGF-1), Transforming growth factorβ, cartilage oligomeric matrix protein, bone morphogenetic protein, and other anabolic gene candidates are among the candidate genes for OA. Genetic changes in OA can lead to defects of a structural protein such as collagen, or changes in the metabolism of bone and cartilage. OA is rarely considered as a simple disorder following Mendelian inheritance being predominantly a multifactorial disease.

However, in the field of OA gene therapy, researches has more focused on gene transfer as a delivery system for therapeutic gene products, rather counteracting genetic abnormalities or polymorphisms. Genes, which contribute to protect and restore the matrix of articular cartilage, are attracting the most attention. These Genes are listed in Table 1. Among all candidates listed below, proteins that block the actions of interleukin-1 (IL-1) or that promote the synthesis of cartilage matrix molecules have received the most experimental scrutiny.

Interleukin-1 as a target in osteoarthritis 
Researches suggest that among all potential mediators, a protein called Interleukin-1 is by far the most potent cause of the pain, joint inflammation and loss of cartilage associated with osteoarthritis. A therapeutic gene used to treat the arthritic joins produces a second protein, which naturally counteracts the effect of interleukin-1. 
The Interleukin 1 receptor antagonist (IL-1Ra), the natural agonist of IL-1, is a protein that binds non-productively to the cell surface of interleukin-1 receptor, therefore blocks the activities of IL-1 by preventing it from sending a signal to IL-1 receptor. 
There are three main researches that prove the benefits of local IL-1Ra gene therapy in animal models of osteoarthritis [4]. Series of experiments on canines, rabbits, and horses demonstrate that local IL-1Ra gene therapy is safe and effective in animal models of OA, according to the fact that recombinant human IL-1Ra strongly protected the articular cartilage from degenerative changes.

Strategies for osteoarthritis gene therapy 
In the context of OA, the most attractive intra- articular sites for gene transfer are the synovium and the articular cartilage. Most experimental progress has been made with gene transfer to a convenient intra-articular tissue, such as the synovium, a tissue amenable to genetic modification by a variety of vectors, using both in vivo and ex vivo protocols.

Gene transfer to synovium 
The major purpose of gene delivery is to alter the lining of the joint in a way that enables them to serve as an endogenous source of therapeutic molecules (Table-1) therapeutic molecules can diffuse and influence the metabolism of adjacent tissues such as cartilage. Genes may be delivered to synovium in animal models of RA and OA by direct, in vivo injection of vector or by indirect, ex vivo methods involving autologous synovial cells, skin fibroblasts, or other cell types such as mesenchymal stem cells.

The direct in vivo approach is intra-articular insertion of a vector to affect synovicytes. Vectors play crucial role in success of this method. The effect of Different vectors for in vivo gene delivery to synovium is summarized in Table 2:

The indirect ex vivo approach involves harvest of synovium, isolation and culture of synoviocytes, in vitro transduction, and injection of engineered synovicytes into the joint.

Gene transfer to cartilage 
Contrary to the synoviocytes which are dividing cells and can be transduced in vivo with high efficacy using either liposomes or viral vectors, in vivo delivery of genes to chondrocytes is hindered by the dense extra cellular matrix that surrounds these cells. Chondrocytes are non- dividing cells, embedded in a network of collagens and proteoglycans; however researches suggest that genes can be transferred to chondrocytes within normal cartilage by intraarticular injection of liposomes containing sendai virus (HVJ- liposomes)  and adeno-associated virus.

Most efficient methods of gene transfer to cartilage have involved ex vivo strategies using chondrocytes or chondroprogenitor cells. Chondrocytes are genetically enhanced by transferring complementary DNA encoding IL-1RA, IGF-1, or matrix break down inhibitors mentioned in Table 1. As discussed before, the transplanted cells could serve as an intra- articular source of therapeutic molecules.

Safety 
One important issue related to human gene therapy is safety, particularly for the gene therapy of non-fatal diseases such as OA. The main concern is the high immunogenicity of certain viral vectors. Retroviral vectors integrate into the chromosomes of the cells they infect. There will be always a chance of integrating into a tumor suppressor gene or an oncogene, leading to virulent transformation of the cell.

See also 
 Disease Modifying Osteoarthritis Drug
 Vectors in gene therapy
 Protein therapy
 Adeno-associated virus
 Gene therapy for epilepsy
 Management of Parkinson's disease

References

Arthritis
Medical genetics
Medical treatments
Gene therapy